TJ High School may refer to:
 Any school named Thomas Jefferson High School
 Governor Thomas Johnson High School, Frederick, Maryland